Kazuhiro Inoue  (born January 31, 1973) is a Japanese mixed martial artist. He competed in the Featherweight and Lightweight divisions.

Mixed martial arts record

|-
| Loss
| align=center| 4-6-3
| Sotaro Yamada
| Technical Submission (rear naked choke)
| Pancrase: Spiral 9
| 
| align=center| 1
| align=center| 2:51
| Tokyo, Japan
| 
|-
| Loss
| align=center| 4-5-3
| Ippo Watanuki
| Submission (kneebar)
| Pancrase: Brave 9
| 
| align=center| 2
| align=center| 2:51
| Tokyo, Japan
| 
|-
| Loss
| align=center| 4-4-3
| Stephen Palling
| Decision (split)
| Warriors Quest 7: Tap Out or Knock Out
| 
| align=center| 3
| align=center| 5:00
| Honolulu, Hawaii, United States
| 
|-
| Draw
| align=center| 4-3-3
| Tetsuo Katsuta
| Draw
| Shooto: Treasure Hunt 8
| 
| align=center| 3
| align=center| 5:00
| Tokyo, Japan
| 
|-
| Draw
| align=center| 4-3-2
| Naoya Uematsu
| Draw
| Shooto: Gig Central 1
| 
| align=center| 3
| align=center| 5:00
| Nagoya, Aichi, Japan
| 
|-
| Loss
| align=center| 4-3-1
| Hiroyuki Abe
| TKO (doctor stoppage)
| Shooto: To The Top 10
| 
| align=center| 1
| align=center| 4:00
| Tokyo, Japan
| 
|-
| Loss
| align=center| 4-2-1
| Masato Shiozawa
| Decision (40-39)
| GCM: The Contenders 6
| 
| align=center| 2
| align=center| 5:00
| Kanagawa, Japan
| 
|-
| Win
| align=center| 4-1-1
| Flavio Santiago
| Decision (unanimous)
| Shooto: To The Top 8
| 
| align=center| 2
| align=center| 5:00
| Tokyo, Japan
| 
|-
| Draw
| align=center| 3-1-1
| Kazuya Abe
| Draw
| Shooto: Gig East 1
| 
| align=center| 2
| align=center| 5:00
| Tokyo, Japan
| 
|-
| Win
| align=center| 3-1
| Takeru Ueno
| Decision (unanimous)
| Shooto: R.E.A.D. 11
| 
| align=center| 2
| align=center| 5:00
| Setagaya, Tokyo, Japan
| 
|-
| Loss
| align=center| 2-1
| Tetsuo Katsuta
| Decision (unanimous)
| Shooto: R.E.A.D. 7
| 
| align=center| 2
| align=center| 5:00
| Setagaya, Tokyo, Japan
| 
|-
| Win
| align=center| 2-0
| Katsuya Toida
| Decision (majority)
| Shooto: R.E.A.D. 5
| 
| align=center| 2
| align=center| 5:00
| Tokyo, Japan
| 
|-
| Win
| align=center| 1-0
| Teruyuki Hashimoto
| Decision (unanimous)
| Shooto: Gateway to the Extremes
| 
| align=center| 2
| align=center| 5:00
| Setagaya, Tokyo, Japan
|

See also
List of male mixed martial artists

References

1973 births
Japanese male mixed martial artists
Featherweight mixed martial artists
Lightweight mixed martial artists
Living people